The Dead River is a  tributary of the Otter Tail River of Minnesota in the United States. It rises east of Dent and flows south through Dead Lake and Walker Lake to its mouth at Otter Tail Lake on the Otter Tail River.

The name Dead River commemorates a massacre of the Ojibwe Indians.

See also
List of rivers of Minnesota

References

Minnesota Watersheds
USGS Hydrologic Unit Map - State of Minnesota (1974)

Rivers of Minnesota
Rivers of Otter Tail County, Minnesota